Adamantius or Adamantios may refer to:

People

Only name
 Adamantius (Pseudo-Origen), 4th-century Christian writer
 Adamantius (physician), 5th-century Jewish physician from Alexandria
 Adamantius (praefectus urbi), 5th-century politician of the Eastern Roman Empire

Nickname
 Origen Adamantius, 3rd century early Christian theologian

First name
 Adamantios Korais (1748–1833), humanist scholar credited with laying the foundations of Modern Greek literature
 Adamantios Androutsopoulos (1919–2000), Prime Minister of Greece from 1973 to 1974
 Adamantios Sampson (fl. 1973–present), archaeologist from Rhodes

Other
Adamantius (journal), academic journal of the Italian Research Group on Origen and the Alexandrian Tradition

See also
Adeimantus (disambiguation)